Lee Addy (born 26 September 1985) is a Ghanaian professional footballer who plays as a defender. He played for the Ghana national team at the 2010 FIFA World Cup.

Club career

Early career
Addy began his senior career in 2007 playing with Nania F.C. Soon after, in 2008, he moved to the Bechem Chelsea playing in the Ghana Premier League.

Red Star Belgrade
At the end of the 2010 FIFA World Cup Addy received a call to move to Europe to play with Serbian SuperLiga club Red Star Belgrade and he signed a contract. He became a regular centre-back at both his club and the Ghana national team.

Dalian Aerbin
On 4 January 2012, Addy completed a three-year deal with newly promoted Chinese Super League side Dalian Aerbin and was handed the squad number 13 after passing a medical test. The move from Serbian club Red Star Belgrade was for a reported transfer fee of $2.2 million.

Dinamo Zagreb
On 10 February 2013, it was announced that Addy had been loaned to Dinamo Zagreb for a year. He signed for Dinamo Zagreb in January 2014. He ended his Dinamo Zagreb spell in late July 2015.

Čukarički
Addy signed a one-year contract with FK Čukarički on 31 August 2015.

Free State Stars
In August 2019 it was reported, that Addy had signed with Free State Stars in South Africa. However, it was later reported in December 2019, that he had terminated his contract with the club.

International career

Early career & 2010 African Nations Cup
On 30 September 2009, Addy made his debut for the Ghana national team as part of a domestic-based team that played a friendly against Argentina. He was part of the Ghana national squad at the 2010 Africa Cup of Nations having played four matches including the lost final against Egypt. and since then he quickly became a regular player of the national team.

2010 World Cup
Addy was called up by Ghana's national team for the 2010 FIFA World Cup In Ghana's opening game at the 2010 World Cup, he entered as a substitute in a 1–0 win over Serbia. He also played in the 1–1 draw against Australia in the group stage, after which he appeared again as a substitute in the Round of 16 2–1 victory over the United States, but couldn't play in the quarter-finals match against Uruguay because of accumulated yellow cards, where Ghana was eliminated in a penalty shoot-out.

Age controversy
Before the 2010 FIFA World Cup, Addy's age became the subject of controversy. When he debuted in the national team in September 2009, he was registered with date of birth 26 September 1985. That statement also stated on most sites on the web. Even FIFA lists Addy as born on 26 September 1985 in the official documents. But when Addy was reported in Ghana's World Cup squad, he had suddenly been five years younger and lists as born on 7 July 1990. The Swedish newspaper Aftonbladet was in contact with FIFA regarding the matter. FIFA informed that they did a passport control on Addy, but they did not find anything suspicious. Also there was a lack of comparative material, because Addy never got any previous passport control.

Honours

Club
Red Star Belgrade
 Serbian Cup: 2011–12

Dinamo Zagreb
 Croatian First League: 2012–13, 2013–14
 Croatian Supercup: 2013

Individual
Ghana Premier League: Best central defender of the 2008 season.

International
Ghana
2010 African Nations Cup: Runner-up

References

External links
 
 

Living people
Footballers from Accra
Ghanaian footballers
Ghana international footballers
Ghanaian expatriate footballers
2010 Africa Cup of Nations players
2010 FIFA World Cup players
2012 Africa Cup of Nations players
Association football defenders
AC Tripoli players
Lusaka Dynamos F.C. players
Free State Stars F.C. players
Dalian Professional F.C. players
Chinese Super League players
F.C. Nania players
Berekum Chelsea F.C. players
Red Star Belgrade footballers
GNK Dinamo Zagreb players
NK Lokomotiva Zagreb players
FK Čukarički players
Serbian SuperLiga players
Croatian Football League players
Expatriate footballers in Lebanon
Ghanaian expatriate sportspeople in Lebanon
Expatriate footballers in Croatia
Expatriate footballers in China
Ghanaian expatriate sportspeople in China
Expatriate footballers in Serbia
Ghanaian expatriate sportspeople in Serbia
Expatriate footballers in Zambia
Ghanaian expatriate sportspeople in Zambia
Expatriate soccer players in South Africa
Ghanaian expatriate sportspeople in South Africa
Alumni of the Accra Academy
Lebanese Premier League players
1985 births